The Toronto Children's Chorus is a children's choir based in Toronto. It was founded in 1978 by Jean Ashworth Bartle. The group has close to 500 members aged 6 to 30.

History

In 1982, the choir won first prize at the International Eisteddfod in Wales. Other awards followed, including first place in the prestigious Let the Peoples Sing Competition in 1993 and numerous 1st places in the CBC choral competition.

The Toronto Children's Chorus has performed at Carnegie Hall (1994), the Kennedy Center (1995), the Kimmel Center (2002), Royal Albert Hall (2002), Sydney Opera House (1999), Salzburg Cathedral (2006) and the Stephansdom (2006). The Chorus was also honoured to serve as Artist-in-Residence for international children's choir festivals in Tuscany, Italy (1995) and Sydney, Australia (1999).

In August 2007, Elise Bradley, a New Zealand conductor and teacher previously based in Auckland, became the new Artistic Director of the organization.

Levels

The TCC consists of five main groups: Preparatory Choir, Training Choir I, II and III, and the Toronto Children's Chorus (main choir). In 2012, the Toronto Youth Choir was founded for those who have graduated out of the Main Choir. In the 2019/20 season, the TYC had 65 choristers aged 16 to 30. Children as young as 5 or 6 can audition for the youngest choir, then begin moving up in the training choir levels until they reach the Main Choir. In the Main Choir, there are also several subgroups, including the Cantare and Chorale ensembles. Within Cantare are Apprentices, Senior Apprentices, and full Cantare members. Within the Chorale choir are Chorealis, Chamber, and the Choral Scholars. The Chamber choir is the group that tours, sometimes joined by members of Chorale.

Tours 

2019 - New Zealand and Australia
2018 - New York (Toronto Youth Choir)
2017 - Spain and the 11th World Symposium on Choral Music in Barcelona
2016 - Boston and New York City - Carnegie Hall
2015 - Russia, Estonia, Latvia, Lithuania, Poland
2014 - Podium 2014 in Halifax, Canada
2013 - Ihlombe South Africa Choral Festival in Cape Town, South Africa
2013 - Montreal and Ottawa - Soundstreams and the Fujii Ensemble
2012 - Podium 2012 in Ottawa, Canada
2012 - Adolf Fredrik Music School's international "Let the Future Sing" festival in Stockholm, Sweden
2011 - 9th World Symposium on Choral Music in Puerto Madryn, Argentina
2011 - Melodia Festival in Rio de Janeiro, Brazil and Buenos Aires, Argentina
2009 - Austria, Czech Republic, Germany
2006 - New York State
2006 - Hungary, Slovakia, Austria

Recordings
Dancing Day (1992)
Mostly Britten (1993)
Come Ye Makers of Song (2000)
My Heart Soars (2004)
Songs of the Lights (2005)
How Sweet the Sound (2006)
A Song for All Seasons (2007)
A Ceremony of Carols (2009)
Sounzscapes from Our Lands (2013)

Conductors 

 1978 to 2007 Jean Ashworth Bartle
 2007 to 2021 Elise Bradley
 2022 Matthew Otto (interim)
 2022 to Present Zimfira Poloz

References

External links
Toronto Children's Chorus web site

Canadian choirs
Musical groups from Toronto
Choirs of children
Musical groups established in 1978
1978 establishments in Ontario